Glycyrrhizol A is a prenylated pterocarpan and an isoflavonoid derivative. It is a compound isolated from the root of the Chinese licorice plant (Glycyrrhiza uralensis).

It may has in vitro antibacterial properties. In one study, the strongest antibacterial activity was observed against Streptococcus mutans, an organism known to cause tooth decay in humans.

References

Pterocarpans
Antibiotics
Phenols